Harry Green (1908 – after 1936) was an English professional footballer who played as an outside forward in the Football League for Oldham Athletic, Leeds United, Bristol City and York City and in non-League football for Mexborough Town and Frickley Colliery.

References

1908 births
Footballers from Sheffield
Year of death missing
English footballers
Association football forwards
Oldham Athletic A.F.C. players
Mexborough Athletic F.C. players
Leeds United F.C. players
Bristol City F.C. players
York City F.C. players
Frickley Athletic F.C. players
English Football League players